Out in Fifty is a 1999 independent film directed and written by Bojesse Christopher and Scott Leet, starring Leet and Mickey Rourke. The film also stars Christina Applegate, Peter Greene, Ed Lauter, Balthazar Getty, James Avery and Nina Offenböck. It is an action-packed psychological thriller film.

Plot
Mississippi boy Ray Frye (Scott Leet) accidentally kills a perverted woman from L.A. while making love to her. Now her vengeful husband, an addict cop no less (Mickey Rourke), is waiting to strike when Frye gets out of prison. Frye's problems deepen when, on parole, he boards with the scheming little family of a chintzy car-wash entrepreneur. There is also a poison-dart serial killer on the loose who may or may not be relevant.

References

External links
 
 

1999 films
American thriller films
1990s psychological thriller films
1990s English-language films
1990s American films